Baston Lodge is a residential villa in St Leonards-on-Sea, Hastings, East Sussex, southern England.

The building was designed by Decimus Burton (1800–1881) as a seaside villa for John Ward, a friend, and completed in 1850. The architecture is in the Italianate style, with coursed stone, chamfered quoins, and plain stone architraves and bands. It has low-pitched slate roofs with two main storeys, an attic, and a basement. There is a three-storey tower with a low-pitched pyramid-shaped roof.

Baston Lodge was the childhood home of the World War II codebreaker Alan Turing (1912–1954) and there is a blue plaque on the front of the building commemorating this. Alan Turing and his elder brother John Turing were wards of Colonel and Mrs Ward.

The building was Grade II listed in 1973. The blue plaque commemorating Alan Turing was unveiled on 23 June 2012, the centenary of Turing's birth.

The villa is located at 1 Upper Maze Hill and is close to St John's Church to the north. Immediately to the west is St Michael's Hospice and to the south is St Leonards Gardens. The building is now divided into apartments and the freehold of the building is owned by Baston Lodge Freehold Ltd.

See also
 Baston, a village in Lincolnshire, England

References

1850 establishments in England
Residential buildings completed in 1850
Grade II listed buildings in East Sussex
Houses in East Sussex
Buildings and structures in Hastings
Apartment buildings in England
Villas in the United Kingdom
Italianate architecture in England
Alan Turing